Goddard USD 265 is a public unified school district headquartered in  Goddard, Kansas, United States.  The district includes the communities of Goddard, Schulte, and nearby rural areas.

Schools
The school district operates the following schools:

High Schools
 Eisenhower High School, 9-12
 Goddard High School, 9-12
 Goddard Academy, 9-12

Middle Schools
 Eisenhower Middle School, 7-8
 Goddard Middle School, 7-8

Intermediate Schools
 Challenger Intermediate School, 5-6
 Discovery Intermediate School, 5-6

Elementary Schools
 Amelia Earhart Elementary School, K-4
 Clark Davidson Elementary School, PreK-4
 Apollo Elementary School, K-4
 Explorer Elementary School, PreK-4
 Oak Street Elementary School, K-4

School board members, 2019–2021 
Jenny Simmons, President 
Gail Jamison, Vice-President
Nicole Hawkins
Sara McDonald
Kevin McWhorter
Ruth Wood
Mark Richards

Members elected in November 2, 2021 at-large election  
Ginger Rose 
Ruth Wood 
Mark Richards

Censorship
In November 2021, the school district removed 29 books from circulation from the district's school libraries, including The Handmaid’s Tale and The Hate U Give, after one parent objected to language he found offensive.  Soon the books were available again, because of the district policy "Challenged materials shall not be removed from use during the review period".

See also
 Kansas State Department of Education
 Kansas State High School Activities Association
 List of high schools in Kansas
 List of unified school districts in Kansas

References

External links
 

School districts in Kansas
Education in Sedgwick County, Kansas